Daylighting a tunnel is to remove its "roof" of overlying rock and soil, exposing the railway or roadway to daylight and converting it to a railway or roadway cut. Tunnels are often daylighted to improve vertical or horizontal clearances—for example, to accommodate double-stack container trains or electrifying rail lines, where increasing the size of the tunnel bore is impractical.

List of daylighted tunnels

 New Zealand
 The railway line through the Manawatu Gorge, when constructed in 1891, had five tunnels. Three of these were daylighted in 2008 to allow for the carriage of large containers (the other two tunnels had their floors lowered).
 United Kingdom
 Liverpool Lime Street station was originally approached through a  twin-track tunnel completed in 1836. The tunnel was daylighted in the 1880s, and replaced with a deep four-track cutting, with only the eastern  approaching Edge Hill railway station remaining as a tunnel.

 United States of America
 Auburn Tunnel on the Schuylkill Canal, daylighted in 1857
 Tunnel No. 5 on the Alaska Railroad's Seward-Anchorage line
 Tunnel No. 5 on the Virginia & Truckee Railroad at Nevada S.R. 341 near Virginia City
 The Gwynedd Cut on the North Pennsylvania Railroad, near North Wales, Pennsylvania, built as a tunnel between 1853 and 1856, daylighted in 1930 when the Reading Railroad electrified the line
 A number of tunnels were open cut for the National Gateway project including:
 Shoo Fly Tunnel (2012)
 Pinkerton Tunnel (2012)
 Benford Tunnel (2012)

See also
 Daylighting (streams)

References

Tunnel construction